The 2009–10 figure skating season began on 1 July 2009, and ended on 30 June 2010. During this season, elite skaters competed at the Olympic level at the 2010 Winter Olympics, on the ISU Championship level at the 2010 European, Four Continents, World Junior, and World Championships. They also competed in elite competitions such as the 2009–10 ISU Grand Prix of Figure Skating.

Season notes 
It was the final season in which the compulsory dance and the original dance were contested in ice dance. Following this season, the International Skating Union instituted the short dance.

Isabelle Delobel competed at the Olympics with partner Olivier Schoenfelder just four-and-a-half months after giving birth. On 28 June 2010, the International Skating Union announced that Evgeni Plushenko had lost his eligibility due to participating in March and April shows without his federation's permission.

Age eligibility 
Skaters competing on the junior level were required to be at least 13 but not 19 – or 21 for male pair skaters and ice dancers – before 1 July 2009. Those who had turned 14 were eligible for the senior Grand Prix series and senior B internationals. Those who turned 15 before 1 July 2009 were also eligible for the senior World, European, and Four Continents Championships.

Music

Partnership changes 
Partnership splits and/or formation of new teams included:

Coaching changes

Retirements 
A number of elite skaters announced their retirement from competition:

Competitions 
Key

Records 
During the season, the following world records were set:

ISU & Olympic Champions
During the season, the following skaters won ISU Championships and the 2010 Winter Olympic Games.

Season's best scores
The following are all the season's best scores set over the season.

Men 
Men's season's best scores on 25 March 2010.

Ladies 
Ladies season's best scores on 27 March 2010.

Pairs 
Pairs season's best scores on 24 March 2010.

Ice dance 
Ice dance season's best scores on 26 March 2010.

World standings

Season-end standings (top 30)

Men's singles

Ladies' singles

Pairs

Ice dance

References 

Seasons in figure skating
2009 in figure skating
2010 in figure skating